Momentum Bank Ballpark (formerly First American Bank Ballpark, Citibank Ballpark, and Security Bank Ballpark) is a ballpark in Midland, Texas. It is primarily used for baseball, and is the home field of the Double-A Midland RockHounds minor league baseball team of the Texas League. Opened in 2002, the stadium holds 6,669 people with 4,709 fixed seats and the rest in berm seating.

History
The first game at Momentum Bank Ballpark was played in 2002. It was named the "Best New Park of 2002" by BaseballParks.com. Momentum Bank Ballpark was originally known as First American Bank Ballpark, but the name was changed in 2005 after Citibank acquired First American Bank of Bryan, Texas. In 2014, the ballpark was again renamed to Security Bank Ballpark. It became Momentum Bank Ballpark in 2020. The ballpark replaced the old Christensen Stadium, the former home of the RockHounds.

Features
The stadium seats 4,709 people, with grass berm areas adding substantially to the overall capacity of 6,669.
22 luxury suites, which are named after players whom spent some time seasoning (or rehabbing) in Midland, are available for rental. Another suite is named for former U.S. President George W. Bush who was raised in Midland.
The ProPetro Diamond Club, which hosts media luncheons for the RockHounds, Sockers, City of Midland, and other outside companies that rent the facility, is located at the back of the concourse behind home plate. Open to suite and pass holders, the Diamond Club has a sizable dining room with a high ceiling within which food is served buffet style from a serving station.

References

External links

Official website
Citibank Ballpark Views - Ball Parks of the Minor Leagues

Citigroup buildings
Baseball venues in Texas
Sports venues completed in 2002
2002 establishments in Texas
Sports in Midland, Texas
Texas League ballparks